Pennsdale is an unincorporated community in Muncy Township, Lycoming County, Pennsylvania, United States.

Notes

Unincorporated communities in Lycoming County, Pennsylvania
Unincorporated communities in Pennsylvania